Bishop Exchange Wrong Diagonal Bishop (角換わり筋違い角 kakugawari suji chigai kaku) is a variation of the Bishop Exchange (Double Static Rook) opening that has an early bishop drop on the 45 square.

This variation is not to be confused with the Primitive Wrong Diagonal Bishop opening, which is characterized by dropping the bishop to 45 (or 65 for White) even earlier.

Development

The Wrong Diagonal Bishop variation of the Bishop Exchange opening was most popular during the 1950s and was often played by Yasuharu Ōyama and Masao Tsukada.

Classic Bishop Exchange

The Classic Bishop Exchange has Black's rook pawn advanced all the way to the middle rank 5 and White has defended the second file with a gold development. White initiates the standard bishop trade, and then, after Black captures the promoted bishop and White moves their silver up to defend the second file is when the Wrong Diagonal Bishop variation starts.

Black drops the bishop forking White's two pawns. 

Thus, the initial moves of the variation are actually the same as the other Bishop Exchange variations up until the moment of the player's bishop drop on the wrong diagonal.

White defends the sixth and fifth file pawns. Black captures White's third file pawn. Since White's right gold has already by developed so that it protects the fourth and second file pawns, White can use their silver now to attack Black's bishop and push it back to the central file.

At this point, Black has two options of either left side bishop development or right side bishop development.

See also

 Bishop Exchange
 Wrong Diagonal Bishop
 Static Rook

Bibliography

External links

 Quest of the Lost Systems: Kakugawari 9: Sujichigai Kaku

Shogi openings
Bishop Exchange openings